Caught in a Cabaret is a  1914 short comedy film written and directed by Mabel Normand and starring Normand and Charles Chaplin.

Plot
Chaplin plays a waiter who fakes being the Prime Minister of Greenland to impress a girl. He then is invited to a garden party where he gets in trouble with the girl's jealous boyfriend.  Mabel Normand wrote and directed comedies before Chaplin and mentored her older co-star.

Cast
 Mabel Normand - Mabel
 Charles Chaplin - Waiter
 Harry McCoy - Lover
 Chester Conklin - Waiter
 Edgar Kennedy - Cafe proprietor
 Minta Durfee - Dancer
 Phyllis Allen - Dancer
 Josef Swickard - Father
 Alice Davenport - Mother
 Gordon Griffith - Boy
 Alice Howell - Party Guest
 Hank Mann - Cabaret Patron
 Mack Swain - Big Tough Man
 Billy Gilbert - Cabaret Patron
 Wallace MacDonald - Party guest

Reviews

The Moving Picture World's review said, "This is another two-reel comedy manufactured in Mack Sennett's comical factory out in Californy State [sic].  It caused so much laughter you couldn't hear what the actors was talkin'. Charles Chaplin was the leading fun maker."

A reviewer for the New York Dramatic Mirror wrote, "Superlatives are dangerous epithets, especially when dealing with pictures.  For that reason it is unwise to call this the funniest picture that has ever been produced, but it comes mighty close to it."

See also
 Charlie Chaplin filmography
List of American films of 1914

References

External links
 
 
 
 lantern slide w/ title "The Jazz Waiter"

1914 films
American black-and-white films
American silent short films
Films directed by Mabel Normand
1914 comedy films
Films produced by Mack Sennett
Silent American comedy films
Articles containing video clips
1914 short films
American comedy short films
Mutual Film films
1910s American films